The following is a list of the South Sydney Rabbitohs club records. The list encompasses the first-grade honours won by South Sydney, records set by the club, their coaches and their players.

Club records
These are NRL records which relate to the South Sydney Rabbitohs.

Grand Finals

Most First Grade Premierships

21

Most Reserve Grade Premierships

20

Highest Score in a Grand Final

42 points versus Manly Sea Eagles in 1951 (Souths won 42–14)

Most Tries in a Grand Final

8 tries versus Manly Sea Eagles in 1951

Most Goals in a Grand Final

9 goals versus Manly Sea Eagles in 1951

Most Tries in a Grand Final by an Individual Player

4 tries by Johnny Graves(rugby league) versus Manly Sea Eagles in 1951

Most Field Goals in a Grand Final by an Individual Player

4 field goals by Eric Simms versus Manly Sea Eagles in 1970 (Souths won 23–12)

Most Points in all Grand Final appearances

42 points by Eric Simms (1965, 1967, 1968, 1969, 1970, 1971)

Most Grand Final successes as a Captain

5 by Jack Rayner (1950, 1951, 1953, 1954, 1955)

Most Grand Final successes as a Coach

5 by Jack Rayner (1950, 1951, 1953, 1954, 1955)

Premiership

Most goals in a season by an individual player

131 by Eric Simms in 1969

Most Career Field Goals by an Individual Player

86 by Eric Simms between 1965 and 1975

Most Career Points scored by a Forward

1,128 by Bernie Purcell between 1949–1952 and 1954–1960

Most Field Goals in a Game by an Individual Player

5 by Eric Simms versus Penrith, Penrith Park, 27 July 1969 (Souths won 40–18)

World Club Challenge

Wins

Highest Score in a WCC

39 points versus St. Helens in 2015 (Souths won 39–0)

Individual awards

Rothmans Medal winners

The Rothmans Medal was previously awarded to the player of the year.

1969 – Denis Pittard
1971 – Denis Pittard

Dally M Medal winners

The Dally M Medal is currently awarded to the player of the year.

1980 – Rocky Laurie

Harry Sunderland Medal winners

1970 – Ron Coote

NSW Player of the Year

1949, 1950 and 1952 – Clive Churchill
1953 – Jack Rayner
1968 and 1969 – Ron Coote

Sun-Herald Best and Fairest Player

1952 – Clive Churchill
1958 – Fred Nelson
1964 – Richie Powell
1972 and 1973 – Denis Pittard

E E Christensen Player of the Year (1946–1977)

1949, 1950 and 1952 – Clive Churchill
1953 – Jack Rayner
1968 and 1969 – Ron Coote

Claude Corbett Memorial Trophy

1950 and 1954 – Clive Churchill

Rugby League Week Player of the Year

1971 – Bob Grant

Dally M Rookie of the Year

1989 – Jim Serdaris
2008 – Chris Sandow
2012 – Adam Reynolds
2013 – George Burgess

ARL Hall of Fame inductees

 Harold Horder
 Clive Churchill
 Ron Coote
 George Treweek

Clive Churchill Medal 

 2014 – Sam Burgess

Individual records

Most First Grade Games for the Club

Most Points for the club

Most points in a season

Most Points in a Match

Most Tries for the Club

Most Tries in a season

Most Tries in a Match

Most Goals for the Club

1 includes 86 field goals

2 includes 22 field goals

3 includes 31 field goals

Most goals in a season

1 includes 19 field goals

2 includes 2 field goals

3 includes 20 field goals

4 includes 12 field goals

5 includes 2 field goals

Most Goals in a Match

1 includes 5 field goals

Team records

Biggest winning margins

Biggest Losing Margins

Biggest Wins vs Active Teams

Biggest Losses vs Active Teams

Biggest Wins vs Discontinued Teams

Biggest Losses vs Discontinued Teams

Longest Winning Streak

16 (2 May 1925 – 8 May 1926)

Longest Losing Streak

22 (23 June 1945 – 12 April 1947)

Golden point games

Premiership Finals Losses

Attendance records
Sydney Football Stadium - Currently known as Allianz Stadium (1988–2005, 2022)

40,000 – South Sydney Rabbitohs v Balmain Tigers (Major semi-final, 10 September 1989)

39,816 - South Sydney Rabbitohs v Sydney Roosters (Elimination Final, 11 September 2022)

39,733 - South Sydney Rabbitohs v Cronulla Sharks (Preliminary Final, 17 September 2022)

Redfern Oval (1948–1987)

23,257 – South Sydney Rabbitohs v Manly Sea Eagles (Round 20, 19 July 1987). A crowd of over 25,000 watched Souths take on the US team, the "Tomahawks", while Souths were excluded from the NRL.

ANZ Stadium - Currently known as Accor Stadium (2006 – present)

83,833 – South Sydney Rabbitohs v Canterbury-Bankstown Bulldogs (Grand Final, 5 October 2014)

Sydney Cricket Ground (1908 – present)

78,056 – South Sydney Rabbitohs v St George Dragons (Grand Final, 18 September 1965)

See also

List of NRL records

References

External links
Rugby League Tables & Statistics The World of Rugby League.
Rabbitohs Club Records National Rugby League.
South Sydney Rabbitohs South Sydney Rabbitohs official website.
Andrews, Malcolm. The ABC of Rugby League. Australia: ABC Books, 2006.
Alan Whiticker & Glen Hudson, The Encyclopaedia of Rugby League Players – South Sydney Rabbitohs, Bas Publishing, 2005.

Records
Sydney-sport-related lists
National Rugby League lists
Australian records
Rugby league records and statistics